Papago Park Military Reservation is a facility of the Arizona Army National Guard in Phoenix, Arizona that is home to the Papago Army Aviation Support Facility, Papago Army Heliport and the Arizona Military Museum. Formerly, it was also home to the World War II POW Camp Papago Park that is adjacent to Papago Park.

The Reservation was established on April 21, 1930 by the 71st Congress.

On Halloween of 2014, a crew from the 2nd Battalion, 285th Aviation Regiment dropped candy on a local neighborhood.

References

Military facilities in Arizona
Phoenix, Arizona